The 2021 Bihar State Soccer League is the 1st season of the Bihar State Soccer League which is the 4th tier of the Indian football system and the top tier of the Bihar football system. The league began on 12 December 2021.

Format
All seven teams will play once with each other in group stage. Top 4 teams will play in knockouts.

Clubs
A  total of 7 teams are participating in the league for the first edition in 2021-22.

See also
2021–22 season in state football leagues of India
2021–22 FD Senior Division
2021–22 Calcutta Premier Division
2021 Manipur State League

References

Football in Bihar
3
2021–22 in Indian football